Hodin is a surname. Notable people with the surname include:

 Oleksiy Hodin (born 1983), Ukrainian footballer and coach
 J. P. Hodin (1905–1995), Czechoslovak art historian

See also
 Odin (name)

French-language surnames